Joseph Anthony (1925 – 16 September 1980) was an Indian footballer. He competed in the men's tournament at the 1952 Summer Olympics.

References

External links
 
 

1925 births
1980 deaths
Indian footballers
Footballers from Bangalore
India international footballers
Olympic footballers of India
Footballers at the 1952 Summer Olympics
Place of birth missing
Association football forwards
East Bengal Club players
Calcutta Football League players